Rylov is a male Russian surname. Its feminine counterpart is Rylova. It may refer to: 
Arkady Rylov (1870–1939), Russian Symbolist painter
Artur Rylov (born 1989), Russian association football player 
Evgeny Rylov (born 1996), Russian swimmer
Sergei Rylov (born 1975), Russian-Azerbaijani figure skater
Yakov Rylov (born 1985), Russian ice hockey defender
Tamara Rylova (1931–2021), Russian speed skater

See also
 

Russian-language surnames